In 2006 the Gulf Volleyball Clubs Champions Championship was won by the Al-Hilal FC team.

League standings

Source: koora.com (Arabic)

References

GCC Volleyball Club Championship